Symphony No. 5 in B Flat can refer to:

Symphony No. 5 (Schubert)
Symphony No. 5 (Bruckner)
Symphony No. 5 (Prokofiev)